Humberto I Station is a station on Line H of the Buenos Aires Underground.  From here, passengers may transfer to Jujuy station on Line E. The station was opened on 18 October 2007, as part of the inaugural section of the line, between Once - 30 de Diciembre and Caseros.

References

External links

Buenos Aires Underground stations
Railway stations opened in 2007
2007 establishments in Argentina